Hans Müller (1909-1977) was a German film and television director.

Selected filmography
 Aufruhr der Herzen (1944)
 And If We Should Meet Again (1947)
 1-2-3 Corona (1948)
 The Girl from the South Seas (1950)
 Bürgermeister Anna (1950)
 Harbour Melody (1950)
  Poison in the Zoo (1952)
 Shooting Stars (1952)
 Carola Lamberti – Eine vom Zirkus (1954)
 The Czar and the Carpenter (1956)
 Triplets on Board (1959)
  (1968, TV series)
  (1969, TV series)
 Butler Parker (1972, TV series, 8 episodes)

External links
 

1909 births
1977 deaths
Mass media people from North Rhine-Westphalia
People from Lüdenscheid